Albert Edward Tame (16 July 1877 – 30 April 1965) was an Australian rules footballer who played for the Collingwood Football Club in the Victorian Football League (VFL).

Notes

External links 

		
Alby Tame's profile at Collingwood Forever

1877 births
1965 deaths
Australian rules footballers from Victoria (Australia)
Collingwood Football Club players